Psych Onation is a Swedish pop-rock music band partly formed by former members of Lambretta.

Psych Onation was started in 2005 after Linda Sundblad, the lead vocalist of Lambretta, announced she would be releasing a solo record thereby causing the end of Lambretta. Marcus Nowak and Petter Lantz from Lambretta were joined by Vilaivon Hagman and Jonas Sjöholm to complete their new band.

Members

 Vilaivon Hagman - vocals
 Marcus Nowak - drums
 Petter Lantz - bass
 Jonas Sjöholm - guitar

Discography

Albums
 Symphony Of Death 2006

Singles
 "Mr. President" 2006
 "Livin' Dead" 2006

External links
Official site www.psychonation.se (no longer available as of 4 October 2013)
 MySpace profile: https://myspace.com/psychonation

Swedish musical groups